Duck netting is a non-competitive sport that, in modern times, is generally limited to play by the members of the Imperial House of Japan and their guests. It is believed to be peculiar to Japan in general, and to the Imperial Household specifically. Duck netting is managed by the Board of Ceremonies of the Imperial Household Agency. Mastery of the sport, which involves swinging a large net to ensnare a startled duck, is not considered difficult.

History
Duck netting may have originated during the Tokugawa shogunate, when noble families in Japan owned private duck ponds. However, another source claims that duck netting is at least 1,200 years old. The social place of duck netting in Japan has been compared to that of fox hunting in Britain. In modern times, it is believed to be peculiar to Japan generally, and to the Imperial Household specifically.
The sport of duck netting is organized by the Grand Master of Ceremonies in his role as head of the Board of Ceremonies of the Imperial Household Agency.

Notable state guests of the Japanese Imperial Household who have participated in duck netting include Haile Selassie, Sujan R. Chinoy, John D. Rockefeller III, and Charles III

.

In the past, duck netting has been conducted at a kamoba in the Hamarikyu Gardens in Tokyo.

Rules
Tame ducks are used to entice wild ducks into an artificial canal from the lake in which they live; upon entering the canal, a screen is dropped across the passage, preventing the wild ducks from returning to the lake. The wild ducks, startled at their sudden entrapment, attempt to fly into the air. The human sportsmen, who have remained hidden behind earthen mounds to either side of the canal, then spring into action with long-handled nets and attempt to net one of the escaping ducks. 

At the conclusion of the contest, the ducks are released. However, in earlier versions of the sport, the ducks would be eaten.

Duck netting is not considered particularly difficult as ducks tend to be slow when taking to the air.

See also
Duck decoy (structure)

References

External links
 Gallery of the Indian ambassador participating in duck netting
 Gallery of Princess Mako of Akishino and Princess Hisako of Takamdo releasing ducks at the conclusion of a duck netting game

Imperial Household Agency
Ducks